Rubidium oxide is the chemical compound with the formula . Rubidium oxide is highly reactive towards water, and therefore it would not be expected to occur naturally. In reality, the rubidium is typically present as a component of (actually, an impurity in) silicate or aluminosilicate. A major source of rubidium is lepidolite, wherein Rb sometimes replaces K.

 is a yellow colored solid.

The alkali metal oxides  crystallise in the antifluorite structure. In the antifluorite motif the positions of the anions and cations are reversed relative to their positions in CaF2, with rubidium ions 4-coordinate (tetrahedral) and oxide ions 8-coordinate (cubic).

Properties
Like other alkali metal oxides, Rb2O is a strong base.  Thus, Rb2O reacts exothermically with water to form rubidium hydroxide.
Rb2O  +  H2O  →  2 RbOH
So reactive is Rb2O toward water that it is considered hygroscopic.  Upon heating, Rb2O reacts with hydrogen to rubidium hydroxide and rubidium hydride:
Rb2O  +  H2  →  RbOH  +  RbH

Synthesis
For laboratory use, RbOH is usually used in place of the oxide. RbOH can be purchased for ca. US$5/g (2006).  The hydroxide is more useful, less reactive toward atmospheric moisture, and less expensive than the oxide.

As for most alkali metal oxides, the best synthesis of Rb2O does not entail oxidation of the metal but reduction of the anhydrous nitrate:
10 Rb  +  2 RbNO3  →  6 Rb2O  +  N2

Typical for alkali metal hydroxides, RbOH cannot be dehydrated to the oxide.  Instead, the hydroxide can be decomposed to the oxide (by reduction of the hydrogen ion) using Rb metal:
2 Rb  +  2 RbOH  →  2 Rb2O  +  H2

Metallic Rb reacts with O2, as indicated by its tendency to rapidly tarnish in air.  The tarnishing process is relatively colorful as it proceeds via bronze-colored Rb6O and copper-colored Rb9O2.  The suboxides of rubidium that have been characterized by X-ray crystallography include Rb9O2 and Rb6O,  as well as the mixed Cs-Rb suboxides Cs11O3Rbn (n = 1, 2, 3).

The final product of oxygenation of Rb is principally RbO2, rubidium superoxide:

Rb  +  O2  →  RbO2

This superoxide can then be reduced to Rb2O using excess rubidium metal:

3 Rb  +  RbO2  →  2 Rb2O

References

Further reading
 
 
 

Rubidium compounds
Bases (chemistry)
Oxides
Fluorite crystal structure